Supercool was a band featuring singer Lantz L'Amour, guitarist Stacey Blades of the version of L.A. Guns featuring singer Phil Lewis, former Faster Pussycat and Liberators bassist Eric Stacy, and at different times drummers Vik Foxx (Enuff Z'nuff, Vince Neil Band, Warrant) and Dave Moreno (Liberators). The band released an EP titled Live At The Wilcox Hotel.

Lantz L'Amour and Stacey Blades also played together in the band Smack.

Eric Stacy and Dave Moreno also played together in the band Liberators.

Discography
Live At The Wilcox Hotel (2001)

External links
For more info, go to http://www.glam-metal.com/staceyblades.html.

Rock music groups from California
Musical groups from Los Angeles